is a Japanese samurai kin group.

History
The clan controlled Saga Domain from the late Sengoku period through the Edo period.

The Nabeshima clan was a cadet branch of the Shōni clan and was descended from the Fujiwara clan. In the late 12th century, Fujiwara no Sukeyori, a descendant of Fujiwara no Hidesato in the 9th generation, received the title of Dazai Shōni (equivalent to that of vice-governor of the military government of Kyūshū) from Shōgun Minamoto no Yoritomo, and the title became the family name.

The clan played an important role in the region as early as the Muromachi period, when it helped suppress opposition to the Ashikaga shogunate's control of Kyūshū. It did not take the name Nabeshima, however, until the late 15th century, when Shōni Shigenao established himself at Nabeshima in Hizen Province (today part of Saga City, Saga Prefecture). Later, in the Sengoku period (1467–1603), the Nabeshima were one of a number of clans which clashed over the island. The Nabeshima sided with the Ryūzōji clan against the Ōtomo clan, though this ultimately ended in failure and the death of Ryūzōji Takanobu at the 1584 battle of Okita Nawate. Several years later, however, the Nabeshima recovered power and prominence by aiding Toyotomi Hideyoshi in his 1587 invasion of Kyūshū; Nabeshima Naoshige was granted the region of Saga as his fief, as a reward for his efforts. Naoshige also contributed to Hideyoshi's invasions of Korea in the 1590s.

The clan initially aided Ishida Mitsunari against Tokugawa Ieyasu in the Sekigahara Campaign in 1600. However, they switched sides to support the Tokugawa, who were ultimately victorious, before the campaign had ended, battling and occupying the forces of Tachibana Muneshige, who was thus prevented from contributing directly to the battle of Sekigahara. Though regarded as tozama daimyō ("outside" lords), and assigned particularly heavy corvée duties, the Nabeshima were allowed to keep their territory in Saga, and in fact had their kokudaka increased. The clan's forces served the new Tokugawa shogunate loyally in the years which followed; they remained in Kyūshū during the 1615 Osaka Campaign as a check against a possible rebellion or uprising by the Shimazu clan, and aided in the suppression of the Shimabara Rebellion of 1637. In recognition of their service, members of the clan were granted the prestigious family name Matsudaira in 1648.

During the Edo period, the clan's Saga Domain became quite famous for the porcelain wares produced there; these are sometimes known as Nabeshima ware
after the name of the clan, or as Imari ware after the port town of Imari from where they were exported.

Notable clan members
Nabeshima Naoshige (1537–1619)
Nabeshima Katsushige (1580–1657)
Nabeshima Motoshige
Nabeshima Naomasa (1814–1871)

References

Further reading
Frederic, Louis (2002). Japan Encyclopedia. Cambridge, Massachusetts: Harvard University Press.
Sansom, George (1961). A History of Japan: 1334–1615. Stanford, California: Stanford University Press.
Sansom, George (1963). A History of Japan: 1615–1867. Stanford, California: Stanford University Press.
Turnbull, Stephen (1998). The Samurai Sourcebook. London: Cassell & Co.
 "The Vampire-Cat", a review of the versions of the Japanese legend about the Vampire Cat of Nabéshima.

 
Japanese clans